Richard Balansag Bitoon (born 14 December 1975,Cebu, Philippines) is a Chess Grandmaster of Philippines. He was the International Master in the year 2003. FIDE awarded him chess Grandmaster title in 2011.

Notable Tournaments

References 

Living people
1975 births
Chess grandmasters
Filipino chess players
Sportspeople from Cebu